"Tarantula" is a song by The Smashing Pumpkins.  It is the first single from their seventh album, Zeitgeist, and their first release since their 2006 reunion.

Release and structure

Billy Corgan mentioned during a concert of June 5 in Berlin that "Tarantula" was titled in honor of the German rock band Scorpions, with whom Corgan had recently collaborated on the Scorpions song "The Cross". The intro and the outro of the song are inspired by the song "Dark Lady" of Scorpions, while Corgan stated that he wrote the solo of the song thinking how Uli Jon Roth could have played it. Corgan and Chamberlin believe the song is a culmination of music they've been listening to all their lives, specifically the Scorpions and UFO.

A 30-second clip of the song was released on May 14, 2007. On May 21, 2007, the single was released on iTunes for the United States, followed by the United Kingdom and Canada on May 22. On this date, "Tarantula" was played for the first time live in Paris at the Pumpkins' first show in seven years. The song was also played on the Late Show with David Letterman on July 9, 2007.

On July 2, a single was released on CD and 7-inch in the UK, both containing the B-side "Death from Above". Both covers have a black-and-white photo of Paris Hilton holding a BlackBerry with the Zeitgeist album cover on the screen, and a low-resolution image of a mushroom cloud in the background. A separate 7-inch was released in a clear plastic sleeve on white vinyl.

On July 15, "Tarantula" entered the UK Rock Singles Chart at number one.

Critical reception
Upon release, "Tarantula" received mixed reviews. Drowned in Sound commented that Corgan's vocals "are trying too hard to sound like Pumpkins vocals, clumsily washed in reverb" and "is too much like a cobbled together montage of Smashing Pumpkins sounds to be exciting."

Alana King of website Roomthirteen called "Tarantula" a "promising track and is proof that the Smashing Pumpkins are as strong and resilient as ever." Rob Taylor of website Clickmusic.com called the single "a slick and professional effort worthy of anyone's ear."

Music video
The music video debuted on July 2, 2007 on Spinner.com.  It features the band (dressed primarily in the white outfits of the 2007 tour) playing with multiple extra people, in front of a psychedelic visual collage, and is partially shot in 3D.  The video was directed by P.R. Brown.

In July 2007, it was announced via the Smashing Pumpkins' official website that the green screen files for the video would be released online. Fans with video editing skills will be allowed to make their own version of the Tarantula video and enter it into a contest via the website.

Two winners were announced in August 2007.  1st place was awarded to Levi Ahmu and 2nd place was awarded to Mason Williams.  Both videos consisted of vast amounts of visual effects.  Honorable mention was made for Ryan Webber for his live action take on the music video.

Additional information
 The song was included in the video game Tony Hawk's Proving Ground.
 The song was featured as the theme song for Total Nonstop Action Wrestling (TNA's) Bound for Glory pay-per-view in 2008.
 This song is a playable track in the music video game Guitar Hero On Tour: Decades.

Formats and track listing
"Tarantula" – 3:51
"Death from Above" – 4:06
"Zeitgeist" – 2:49 (Dutch CD single bonus track)

Charts

References

External links
Spinner.com full video available for streaming.
Spinner.com full song available for streaming.
Levi Ahmu's first place fan made music video.
Ryan Webber's third place fan made music video.

2007 singles
The Smashing Pumpkins songs
Songs written by Billy Corgan
Song recordings produced by Billy Corgan
Stoner rock songs
2007 songs
Reprise Records singles